Jamshed Ahmad Khan Dasti (born 15 February 1978) is a Pakistani politician who had been a member of the National Assembly of Pakistan between 2008 and May 2018.

Early life
He was born on 15 February 1978.

Political career

He was elected to the National Assembly of Pakistan on ticket of Pakistan People's Party from NA-178 Muazaffargarh-III in 2008 Pakistani general election.

In 2010, he resigned from the National Assembly for possessing a fake BA degree after which the Supreme Court of Pakistan ordered him to present his graduation degree.

He was re-elected to the National Assembly from Constituency NA-178 in a by-election held in 2010. In 2012, he quit PPP.

In April 2013 Dasti was sentenced to 3 years in prison and 5,000 Rupees fine for presenting a fake graduation degree during the 2008 election. Following the court verdict he was arrested from outside the courtroom. On foreseeing the court verdict he announced his decision of not contesting in the general elections of 2013 a day earlier the court announced the verdict. 

On 10 April 2013, the Multan bench of Lahore High Court heard Dasti's appeal and overturned his conviction of 3 years and 5000 Rs fine hence paving the way for him to contest the elections. In 2013, he joined Pakistan Muslim League (N).

He was re-elected to the National Assembly of Pakistan as an independent candidate from NA-177 Muazaffargarh-II and NA-178 Muazaffargarh-III in 2013 Pakistani general election.
In 2018 Pakistani general election he ran from NA-182 Muzaffargarh but he did not win.

Controversies
He was nominated as accused in a murder case in 2015.

In June 2017, Dasati was arrested while he was returning to Muzzafargarh from Islamabad, for allegedly opening a water canal forcibly in Muzzaffargarh, to irrigate the farming lands. His bail request was approved by an Anti-Terrorism Court a few days later.

References

Living people
1978 births
Baloch people
Pakistani MNAs 2008–2013
Pakistani MNAs 2013–2018
People from Muzaffargarh District
Pakistan People's Party politicians
People from Muzaffargarh
Politicians from Muzaffargarh